The Sevetti moraine is a particular assemblage of morainic forms found between Partakko and Sevettijärvi in northern Finland. They have rugged surfaces.

See also
Pulju moraine
Veiki moraine

References

Glacial deposits of Finland
Moraines of Europe
Landforms of Finland
Landforms of Lapland (Finland)